L. T. Walker was an American college football coach. He was the fifth head football coach at Prairie View State Normal & Industrial College—now known as Prairie View A&M University—in Prairie View, Texas, serving for one season, in 1944, and compiling a record of 3–6.

Head coaching record

References

Year of birth missing
Year of death missing
Prairie View A&M Panthers football coaches